Euclera meones is a species of moth in the subfamily Arctiinae first described by Stoll in 1780. It is found in Suriname and Colombia.

References

Arctiinae